The 2006–07 ISU World Standings, are the World Standings published by the International Skating Union (ISU) during the 2006–07 season.

The 2006–07 ISU World Standings for single & pair skating and ice dance, are taking into account results of the 2004–05, 2005–06 and 2006–07 seasons.

World Standings for single & pair skating and ice dance

Season-end standings 
The remainder of this section is a list, by discipline, published by the ISU.

Men's singles (30 skaters)

Ladies' singles (30 skaters)

Pairs (30 couples)

Ice dance (30 couples)

See also 
 ISU World Standings and Season's World Ranking
 List of highest ranked figure skaters by nation
 List of ISU World Standings and Season's World Ranking statistics
 2006–07 figure skating season

References

External links 
 International Skating Union

ISU World Standings and Season's World Ranking
Standings and Ranking
Standings and Ranking